Bellemerea is a genus of saxicolous (rock-dwelling) crustose lichens in the family Lecideaceae. The genus was circumscribed in 1984 by Josef Hafellner and Claude Roux,  with B. alpina as the type species. The generic name honours French lichenologist André Henri Bellemère (1927–2014).

Species
Bellemerea alpina 
Bellemerea cinereorufescens 
Bellemerea cupreoatra 
Bellemerea diamarta 
Bellemerea elegans 
Bellemerea pullata 
Bellemerea sanguinea 
Bellemerea subcandida 
Bellemerea subnivea 
Bellemerea subsorediza

References

Lecideales
Lecideales genera
Lichen genera
Taxa described in 1984
Taxa named by Josef Hafellner
Taxa named by Claude Roux